The Eldorado Network is a 1979 espionage novel by Derek Robinson, published by Hamish Hamilton. Three sequels followed: Artillery of Lies in 1991, Red Rag Blues in 2006, and Operation Bamboozle in 2009.  The first novel, like all of Robinson's work, is based on fact, in this case a genuine double-agent known as "Garbo".

Plot introduction
Set mainly in Madrid and Lisbon in 1940 and 1941, it concerns the young Spaniard Luis Cabrillo, who witnesses the bombing of Durango during the Spanish Civil War, and later joins the Abwehr, or German intelligence service. He is enthusiastic and resourceful, and after completing his training he is sent to London to spy on the British—codename: Eldorado. However, he gets only as far as Lisbon, where he rents an office, buys an almanac and a guidebook, and begins concocting misinformation to mail back to his superiors in Madrid. The Abwehr pays him for each report and for each agent he recruits, and before long Luis has established a network of fake spies from all over the British isles.

Luis's character and his audacious deception operation was closely modeled on that of Juan Pujol García, code-named GARBO by the British, and ARABEL by the Germans. Uniquely, he received both an Iron Cross, Second Class, for his services to the German war effort (authorised by Hitler himself) and an MBE from King George VI in 1944.

While inspired by fact, and carefully researched, the novel is rich with Robinson's trademark black humour and verbal wit.

Fiction set in 1940
Fiction set in 1941
1979 British novels
British thriller novels
British spy novels
Novels set in Lisbon
Novels set in Madrid
Hamish Hamilton books